Dobra  is a village in the administrative district of Gmina Staszów, within Staszów County, Świętokrzyskie Voivodeship, in south-central Poland.

The village has a population of  270.

Demography 
According to the 2002 Poland census, there were 241 people residing in Dobra village, of whom 50.6% were male and 49.4% were female. In the village, the population was spread out, with 23.7% under the age of 18, 30.3% from 18 to 44, 19.5% from 45 to 64, and 26.6% who were 65 years of age or older.
 Figure 1. Population pyramid of village in 2002 – by age group and sex

References

Villages in Staszów County